Germany's Next Topmodel, cycle 11 was the eleventh cycle of Germany's Next Topmodel. It aired on ProSieben from February to May 2016.

The international destinations for this cycle were Lanzarote, Fuerteventura, Madrid, Milan, Los Angeles, New York City, Miami, Sydney, Shanghai and Majorca.

The winner of the competition was 20-year-old Kim Hnizdo from Bad Homburg vor der Höhe. Her prizes included a modeling contract with ONEeins fab Management, a spread and cover in the German Cosmopolitan, a €100,000 cash prize and an Opel Adam.

Contestants
(ages stated are at start of contest)

Episode summaries

Episode 1: Neue Regeln. Neue Jury. Neuer Style. 
Original airdate: 

This was the casting episode. The top 50 girls were narrowed down to the top 30 after meeting the judges for the first time. The top 30 contestants then had their first live runway show. After the runway concluded, 24 contestants were chosen to advance into the competition. The contestants were divided into two teams of twelve. Half of them would be in Team Michael and the other half in Team Thomas.

Episode 2: Zwei Teams, zwei Inseln
Original airdate: 

Team Michael and team Thomas were divided to two islands - Lanzarote and Fuerteventura. After arriving at their new accommodation, they soon noticed all luxury and glamour was gone. Team Michael did a photo shoot in the dunes, where Fred struggled to deliver. Meanwhile, team Thomas had a group shoot challenge with Toni Garrn. After finishing the photo shoot in the dunes, the girls in team Michael faced a runway challenge featuring Toni. Team Thomas continued on the beach for their first shoot. While the whole group received praise for their results, Heidi called out Saskia and Lara-Kristin as the weakest of the group. At elimination, the unsafe contestants were Fred, Lara-Kristin, Saskia, Sophie and Laura Penelope, who was originally safe from elimination but landed in the bottom for refusing to have her dreadlocks cut, and was given the choice of staying in the competition on the condition that she allow her dreadlocks to be cut, or going home. Out of the unsafe girls from team Michael (Fred and Sophie), Fred was eliminated, and out of those from team Thomas (Lara-Kristin and Saskia), Saskia was sent home, while Laura Penelope decided against her makeover and was also out of the competition.

After the airing of the episode, it was revealed by ProSieben that Luisa from team Michael withdrew from the competition for personal reasons before the other members of team Michael travelled to Fuerteventura. Her withdrawal was not shown during the episode.

Quit: Luisa Bolghiran
Challenge winner: Shirin Kelly
Bottom five: Fred Riss, Lara-Kristin Bayer, Laura Penelope Baumgärtner, Saskia Böhlcke & Sophie Schweer
Quit: Laura Penelope Baumgärtner
Eliminated: Fred Riss & Saskia Böhlcke
Featured photographer: Matt McCabe
Special guests: Toni Garrn

Episode 3: Das Sirupshooting 
Original airdate: 18 February 2016

After castings in Madrid and Milan, the teams reunited in Los Angeles.

Booked for job: Julia Wulf, Lara Helmer, Shirin Kelly & Yusra Babekr-Ali
Eliminated: Shirin Kelly & Sophie Schweer
Featured photographer: Blake Little

Episode 4: Das große Umstyling 
Original airdate: 25 February 2016

The makeovers took place this week, with some girls receiving more drastic changes than others. The girls then did a sedcard photoshoot.

Challenge winner: Lara-Kristin Bayer
Immune from elimination: Lara-Kristin Bayer
Eliminated: Cindy Unger
Guest judge: Andreja Pejić
Featured photographer: Max Montgomery

Episode 5: Es geht hoch hinaus
Original airdate: 3 March 2016

The girls did a shooting at great heights. Afterwards, Team Thomas flew to New York City while Team Michael headed to Miami.

Best photo: Fata Hasanovic
Booked for job: Elena Carriere, Elena Kilb, Fata Hasanovic, Jasmin Lekudere, Julia Wulf, Luana Florea & Taynara Silva Wolf
Eliminated: Jennifer Daschner & Laura Bräutigam
Guest judge: Eva Cavalli
Featured photographer: Robert Erdmann

Episode 6: Lasst die Puppen tanzen
Original airdate: 10 March 2016

For the photoshoot, the girls were divided into four groups, with each group receiving a different color theme and accessories. They later faced a runway challenge vying for a chance to participate in a casting for Berlin Fashion Week.

Booked for job: Team Michael
Eliminated: Christin Götzke
Bottom two: Laura Franziska Blank & Yusra Babekr-Ali
Eliminated: Yusra Babekr-Ali
Special guests: Winnie Harlow
Featured photographer: Rankin

Episode 7: Nackt im Dschungel
Original airdate: 17 March 2016

The teams headed to Sydney for a nude photo shoot in a jungle.

Booked for job: Luana Florea
Immune from elimination: Luana Florea
Bottom three: Camilla Cavalli, Lara Helmer & Lara-Kristin Bayer
Eliminated: Lara-Kristin Bayer
Special guests: Michael Costello
Featured photographer: Damian Bennett

Episode 8: Jetzt wird's heißkalt
Original airdate: 24 March 2016

The models did a photo shoot in an ice truck and had to prove themselves on a runway.

Best photo: Fata Hasanovic
Challenge winner: Jasmin Lekudere
Bottom three: Camilla Cavalli, Elena Kilb & Laura Franziska Blank
Eliminated: Camilla Cavalli
Featured photographer: Henryk Lobacezwski

Episode 9: Die Goldenen Zwanziger
Original airdate: 31 March 2016

The models did a casting for Heidi's underwear line and flew to Los Angeles to have a group photo shoot with a snake in a theatre.

Best photo: Jasmin Lekudere
Booked for job: Elena Carriere
Quit: Julia Wulf
Bottom three: Lara Helmer, Laura Franziska Blank & Luana Florea
Eliminated: Laura Franziska Blank
Featured photographer: Adam Flipp, Mario Schmolka

Episode 10: Blind Marriage
Original airdate: 7 April 2016

The models acted out a scene with a male model, and did a photoshoot with a perfume campaign in mind. They then took part in a fashion film depicting a wedding ceremony with an "ugly" groom.

Booked for job: Elena Carriere
Bottom three: Elena Kilb, Lara Helmer & Laura Bleicher
Eliminated: Laura Bleicher
Featured photographer: Christian Anwander
Special guests: Aladdin Ishmael, Del Keens, John Economou, Marcellus Williams

Episode 11: Blanker Horror
Original airdate: 14 April 2016

This week's photo shoot took place in a haunted mansion with male model Tim Neff, while the runway was located in a desert.

Booked for job: Jasmin Lekudere
Challenge winner: Elena Carriere
Bottom two: Lara Helmer & Luana Florea
Eliminated: Luana Florea
Featured photographer: Russell James

Episode 12: Tränen über Tränen
Original airdate: 21 April 2016

Kim and Elena C. flew to New York City after being chosen by Heidi last week to go to the amfAR Gala. Crying in the rain while posing with a car was the brief for the photoshoot. A casting for Opel concluded this week's challenges with Kim booking her first job.

Booked for job: Kim Hnizdo
Featured photographer: Brian Bowen Smith
Special guests: Zac Posen, Uma Thurman, Robert DeNiro, Jay Z, Paris Hilton, Ryan Reynolds

Episode 13: Einzug ins Halbfinale
Original airdate: 28 April 2016

The casting for Gillette Venus took place this week. The girls then did a photoshoot with their family members.

Booked for job: Fata Hasanovic
Bottom four: Elena Kilb, Fata Hasanovic, Lara Helmer & Taynara Silva Wolf
Eliminated: Elena Kilb
Featured photographer: Andrew Macpherson
Special guests: Patrick Karcher

Episode 14: Das Halbfinale
Original airdate: 5 May 2016

Eliminated: Lara Helmer
Bottom two: Jasmin Lekudere & Taynara Silva Wolf
Second eliminated: None
Featured photographer: 
Special guests: Stefanie Giesinger

Episode 15: Das große Finale
Original airdate: 12 May 2016

The girls attended castings in Shanghai. Before the first elimination Elena came out as bisexual and revealed she has had a crush on Kim. Taynara was eliminated first. Laura Bl. was chosen to open the Top 21 walk after an online voting between the girls who did not reach the final. Jasmin was eliminated second, followed by Fata after a photoshoot. After the final walk, Kim was declared the winner, with Elena placing second.
Booked for job: Elena Carriere, Fata Hasanovic, Jasmin Lekudere, Kim Hnizdo & Taynara Silva Wolf
Final five: Elena Carriere, Fata Hasanovic, Jasmin Lekudere, Kim Hnizdo & Taynara Silva Wolf
Eliminated: Taynara Silva Wolf
Top 21 walk opener: Laura Bleicher
Final four: Elena Carriere, Fata Hasanovic, Jasmin Lekudere & Kim Hnizdo
Eliminated: Jasmin Lekudere
Final three: Elena Carriere, Fata Hasanovic & Kim Hnizdo
Eliminated: Fata Hasanovic
Final two: Elena Carriere & Kim Hnizdo
Germany's Next Topmodel: Kim Hnizdo
Featured photographer: Kristian Schuller 
Special guests: Nick Jonas, Sean Paul, Jay Sean, Rebecca Mir, will.i.am

Summaries

Results table

 The contestant won best photo
 The contestant quit the competition
 The contestant was immune from elimination
 The contestant was in danger of elimination
 The contestant was eliminated
 The contestant won the competition

Photo shoot guide
 Episode 2 photo shoots: Swimwear on the beach; Sand dune in B&W
 Episode 3 photo shoot: Wearing swimwear covered in syrup
 Episode 4 photo shoot: Sedcards
 Episode 5 photo shoot: Swing couture
 Episode 6 photo shoot: Colorful outfits in groups
 Episode 7 photo shoot: Nude with animals in the jungle
 Episode 8 photo shoot: Ice fairies
 Episode 9 photo shoot: 20's lingerie in groups with a snake
 Episode 10 video shoot: Brides with an "ugly" model
 Episode 11 photo shoot: Exorcism with a male model
 Episode 12 photo shoot: 40's styling while crying in the rain
 Episode 13 photo shoot: Posing with family members
 Episode 14 photo shoot: Cosmopolitan covers
 Episode 15 photo shoot: Posing on the beach with inflatable toys

References

External links 
Official Website

Germany's Next Topmodel
2016 German television seasons
Television shows filmed in Spain
Television shows filmed in Italy
Television shows filmed in Los Angeles
Television shows filmed in New York City
Television shows filmed in Miami
Television shows filmed in Australia
Television shows filmed in Shanghai